The Nashville NightWatch were a professional ultimate team from Nashville, Tennessee playing in the South Division of the American Ultimate Disc League. The team was founded in 2015 and folded after the 2018 season.

History

Breaking gender barriers
The Raleigh Flyers made news in 2015 by signing the first ever female professional ultimate player, Jessi Jones, to play in their game against the Nashville NightWatch as part of "Women's Ultimate Day". The NightWatch went a step further in 2017 by rostering Jesse Shofner from the beginning of the season. Shofner subsequently scored two goals in the NightWatch's first game of the 2017 season, making her the first woman to do so in any AUDL game.

Closing
An American Ultimate Disc League announcement on November 21, 2018, stated that the NightWatch had folded, with owner David Trett aiming for a return to the league after a time of increased player development.

Record

2017 Schedule

References

Ultimate teams established in 2015
Ultimate (sport) teams
2015 establishments in Tennessee
2018 disestablishments in Tennessee
Ultimate teams disestablished in 2018